Mad Season is the thirteenth studio album by American hip hop duo Twiztid. It was released on April 20, 2020 through Majik Ninja Entertainment, with no prior announcement. Recording sessions took place at the Dojo in Michigan and at Inkling Studios in New Zealand. Production was primarily handled by Young Wicked, along with Godsynth, Fritz "The Cat" Van Kosky, A Danger Within, Charlie Beans, Jimmy Urine and ScatteredBrains. It features guest appearances from Axe Murder Boyz, Blaze Ya Dead Homie, Anybody Killa, Bingx, Ekoh, Hyro The Hero, Jimmy Urine and Stevie Stone.

Track listing

Charts

References 

2020 albums
Twiztid albums
Majik Ninja Entertainment albums